The following is a list of institutions offering type design education.

Type design (also: typeface design, pop. font design), the art of creating typefaces, is taught at art and design colleges around the world. A small number of institutions offer a degree in type design; many others offer type design courses as part of their BA or MA curriculum in Graphic Design or Visual Communication. When no full type design course is offered, schools may invite professional type designers to give workshops; these one-off events are not listed in the overview below.

Specialized type design degrees

Argentina

Universidad de Buenos Aires
FADU/UBA, Secretaría de Posgrado
MT-UBA, Maestría en Tipografía
Degree:

Brazil

Centro Universitário Senac, São Paulo
Pós-graduação Senac-SP
Curso de Pós-graduação em Tipografia
Degree: Lato sensu postgraduate

France

École Estienne, Paris
Atelier de Création Typographique
DSAA Design Typographique
Degree: Master 1

École supérieure d’art et de design, Amiens
EsadType
Post-diplôme Ésad Amiens
Degree: Post-master course

Atelier National de Recherche Typographique, Nancy
ANRT
Degree: Post-master course

Germany

Hochschule für Grafik und Buchkunst Leipzig
Class Type-Design
Degree: Diplom Type-Design (MFA equivalent)

Bauhaus-Universität Weimar
Professorship for Type Design and Typography
Degree: Visual Communication (B.A.), Visual Communication (M.A.)

Mexico

Centro de Estudios Gestalt, Veracruz
Maestría en Diseño Tipográfico

The Netherlands

Koninklijke Academie van Beeldende Kunsten (KABK), The Hague
(Royal Academy of Art (The Hague))
Master of Design Type and Media
Head of Program: Erik van Blokland
Degree: MA

Spain

Tipo.g 

Laura Meseguer, Co-director 
Degree: Diploma in Typographic Creation

University School of Design and Art of Barcelona (EINA) 
https://www.eina.cat/es/masters-y-postgrados/creacion-tipografica 
Degree: Diploma in Typographic Creation

Switzerland

École cantonale d'art de Lausanne (ECAL)
(University of Applied Sciences Western Switzerland)
MA Art Direction: Type Design
Degree: MA Art Direction

Zürcher Hochschule der Künste, (University of the Arts) ZHdK, Zürich
CAS Schriftgestaltung 
(Certificate of Advanced Studies in Type Design)
MAS Type Design and Typography 
(Master of Advanced Studies in Type Design and Typography)
Degree: Certificate

United Kingdom

University of Reading
Department of Typography & Graphic Communication
MA in Typeface Design 
Degree: MA Typeface Design 
Degree: PhD Typography

Anglia Ruskin University

Degree: PHD Graphic Design & Typography

United States

The Cooper Union for the Advancement of Science and Art, New York City
Postgraduate Certificate in Typeface Design (Type@Cooper)
Degree: Certificate

Letterform Archive, San Francisco
Postgraduate Certificate in Typeface Design (Type West)
Degree: Certificate

School of Visual Arts, New York City
SVA Type Lab A 4-week immersive program in Typeface Design
Degree: CE Summer Residency

Type design courses at design colleges and universities

Australia

University of Technology Sydney
School of Design, Faculty of Design, Architecture & Building
Bachelor of Design in Visual Communication

Belgium

Plantin Instituut voor Typografie, Antwerp
Expert Class Type Design
Degree: Certificate

PXL-MAD, Hasselt
Reading Type & Typography
Degree: Bachelor and Master

ENSAV La Cambre, Brussels
Atelier de Typographie & Design Graphique 
Degree: Bachelor and Master

Brazil

Universidade Federal do Ceará (UFC)
Bacharelado em Design (Undergraduate)

Centro Universitário Senac
Bacharelado em Design / Habilitação em Comunicação Visual (Undergraduate)

Universidade de São Paulo, Faculdade de Arquitetura e Urbanismo
Curso de Design (Undergraduate)

Universidade Federal do Espírito Santo (UFES)
Bacharelado em Desenho Industrial / Habilitação em Programação Visual (Undergraduate)

Universidade Federal de Santa Maria (UFSm)
Bacharelado em Desenho Industrial / Habilitação em Programação Visual (Undergraduate)

Universidade Estadual Paulista 'Julio de Mesquita Filho'  (UNesp, Bauru)
Bacharelado em Design com habilitação em Design Gráfico (Undergraduate)

Escola Superior de Propaganda e Marketing  (ESPM)
Bacharelado em Design com habilitação em Comunicação Visual e ênfase em Marketing (Undergraduate)

Canada

Emily Carr University of Art + Design, Vancouver
Studio courses in typography 
Studio course in Type Design

University of Guelph Humber, Toronto
Course in Type Design 
Instructor: Patrick Griffin

OCAD University, Toronto
Course in The Art of Type

York University, Toronto
Course in Typeface Design

Université du Québec à Montréal, Montreal
École de design 
Course in Type design 
Instructors: Alessandro Colizzi, Étienne Aubert-Bonn

Colombia

Universidad Nacional de Colombia, Bogotá
Studio course in Type Design

Czech Republic

UMPRUM (AKA VŠUP or AAAD), Prague
(Academy of Arts, Architecture and Design)
Studio of Type Design and Typography

VUT: FaVU,  Brno
(Faculty of Fine Arts at the Brno University of Technology)

Denmark

Danish School of Media, Copenhagen

The Danish Design School, Copenhagen

Finland

Aalto University School of Art and Design
Department of Media

KyAMK, Kymenlaakso University of Applied Sciences

France

École supérieure d’art et de design (ESAD), Amiens
Post-diplôme « Typographie & language »
diplome.esad-amiens.fr Post-diplôme Ésad Amiens

ESAC, Pau
Atelier de typographie

Germany

HAW Hochschule für Angewandte Wissenschaften, Hamburg
BA / MA Kommunikationsdesign mit Schwerpunkt Type Design

Designschule München
(Berufsfachschule für Kommunikationsdesign)

Fachhochschule Augsburg
(University of Applied Science)
Fachbereich Gestaltung, Studiengang Kommunikationsdesign

Berliner technische Kunsthochschule BTK
(University of Applied Science)
Fachbereich Design, studiengangsübergreifend

Fachhochschule Potsdam
(University of Applied Science)
Fachbereich Design, Modul Kommunikationsdesign

Hochschule Darmstadt
(University of Applied Science)
Fachbereich Gestaltung, Studiengang Kommunikationsdesign

Hochschule Niederrhein
(University of Applied Science)
Fachbereich Design, Faculty of Design

Hochschule der Bildenden Künste Saar
(Academy of Fine Arts Saar)
Studiengang Kommunikationsdesign (BFA, Diplom, MFA)

Kunsthochschule Weißensee, Berlin
(Academy of Fine and Applied Arts Berlin-Weißensee)
Studiengang Visuelle Kommunikation (BFA, Master)

Muthesius Kunsthochschule, Kiel
(Muthesius University of Fine Arts and Design)
Department of Design, Communication Design, Typography, Typeface Design BA and MA courses

Fachbereich Design, Studiengang Kommunikationsdesign, Typografie, Schriftgestaltung BA and MA courses

Ireland 
National College of Art & Design, Dublin

BA(Hons) Graphic Design

Italy
Isia Urbino, Urbino 
Typographic techniques  
Type design 

Politecnico di Milano, Milano 
Type Design (Communication Design BA)

México 
Benemérita Universidad Autónoma de Puebla, Puebla
Specialization course in Typeface Design

Poland

Akademia Sztuk Pięknych, Poznań
Poznaniu Pracownia Znaku i Typografii
Sign and Typography Studio

Akademicki Kurs Typografii, Warszawa
Akademicki Kurs Typografii

Portugal

Communication and Art Department, University of Aveiro
Course Syllabus
Typography Course blog

Escola Superior de Arte e Design das Caldas da Rainha, Instituto Politécnico de Leiria
Graphic Design Course Type Design studies

Escola Superior de Arte e Design de Matosinhos
Communication Design Course Type Design studies

Fine Art Faculty of the University of Porto
Course Syllabus 
Type Design course website (course description, blog, projects, results,…)

Russia

British Higher School of Art and Design, Moscow
Course of Type & Typography

Moscow State University of Printing Arts
Type Design Workshop

Spain

Tipo.g Escuela de Tipografía de Barcelona
Tipo.g Escuela de Tipografía de Barcelona

Sweden

Södertörn University, Stockholm 
Typsnittsdesign och typografi 
Typsnittsdesign och fontutveckling

United States
California Institute of the Arts
Program in Graphic Design

Maine College of Art
Undergraduate program in Graphic Design (BFA)

Massachusetts College of Art & Design
Graphic Design undergraduate program (BFA)

Parsons School of Design, New York
Undergraduate Type Design

Portland State University
Intro Level Type Design Course

Pratt Institute
School of Art and Design

Rhode Island School of Design
1 Undergraduate and Masters Introduction to Type Design course

Savannah College of Art and Design
1 type face design undergraduate, 3 graduate level typeface design classes and 1 typeface marketing

School of the Museum of Fine Arts at Tufts University, Boston
Digital Type Founding: a fifteen-week course in type design
Instructor: Charles Gibbons

School of Visual Arts (SVA), New York
Continuing Education course in Type Design

University of Washington School of Art, Art History, & Design
The Visual Communication Design Program

Yale School of Art
Letterform/Type Design (showcase of previous work)

California College of the Arts
One class on typeface design, offered as an investigative studio in junior year

Type West at Letterform Archive
A year-long postgraduate certificate in typeface design grounded in the Letterform Archive collection of over 50,000 specimens from type and design history

California State University, Los Angeles
Typeface Design

Notes

External links
 Education page of the ATypI website: Association Typographique Internationale, the worldwide association of typographers, typeface designers and manufacturers
 Education Wiki on Typophile
Brazilian Typography Education Wiki (in Portuguese)
Não conserte o que não está quebrado - Student experience during the Brazilian Postgraduate Studies in Typography (in Portuguese)

Typography
Type design education, Institutions offering
Design